is a Japanese manga artist who is best known for his gaslamp fantasy series Tegami Bachi ("Letter Bee"). The first manga series he created was called I'll, and was a basketball series. All of Asada's manga were serialized in the monthly shōnen anthology Monthly Shōnen Jump (which has since been discontinued; Tegami Bachi now appears in its replacement Jump Square). He made his debut in 1986. He acquired a fanbase with Mint: Sleeping Rabbit, Renka by degrees, and his popularity improved with I'll. In his personal life, he is part of a unit with Shou Tajima (best known for Psych) and Takeshi Obata (best known for Hikaru no Go and Death Note), and his creation activity with "AQUARIOS 3".

Works

Manga 
Hades (oneshot)
Bad da ne Yoshiokun!
Mint: Sleeping Rabbit
Renka
Indian Summer (oneshot)
I'll
Tegami Bachi
Pez (oneshot)

Other works 
Cheer Boys!! (anime, original character designs, 2016) 
Akanesasu Shōjo (multimedia franchise, character designs and concept art, 2018)
Dororo (2019) (anime, original character designs, 2019)

References

External links 
Hiroyuki Asada.com

1968 births
Living people
People from Yokohama
Manga artists from Kanagawa Prefecture